EPLO may refer to:

 Emergency Preparedness Liaison Officers, personnel deployed by Air Forces Northern National Security Emergency Preparedness Directorate, Florida, US
Ethiopian People's Liberation Organization, original name of the Ethiopian People's Revolutionary Party 
European Parliament Liaison Office with the US Congress
European Peacebuilding Liaison Office, an independent civil society platform of European NGOs
European Public Law Organization, successor to the European Public Law Center, based in Greece